KHKM (98.7 FM) is a non-commercial educational radio station licensed to Hamilton, Montana, serving the Missoula, Montana area. KHKM airs a Christian country music format.

History
In January 2012, KBQQ and its oldies format moved from 106.7 FM Pinesdale, Montana to 98.7 FM Hamilton, Montana, swapping frequencies with CHR-formatted KXDR. In May 2012, KBQQ changed their call letters to KHKM and changed their format to classic country, branded as "98.7 The Hawk".

On September 14, 2018, KHKM changed their format from classic country to variety hits, branded as "Max 98.7 & 96.9".

On June 14, 2022, it was announced that K245AP will drop its simulcast with KHKM and will be replaced with the "Zoo-FM" branding, which will move from KENR, as KHKM is being sold to Legacy Broadcasting and will change its format to its Today's Christian Country network.

References

External links

Radio stations established in 1998
HKM